The Force: Manchester is a British TV Series shown on Sky One. It is a documentary show on the work of the frontline officers and staff of the Greater Manchester Police, England's second largest police force.

References

External links

Sky UK original programming